National Tertiary Route 905, or just Route 905 (or ) is a National Road Route of Costa Rica, located in the Guanacaste province.

Description
In Guanacaste province the route covers Nicoya canton (Nicoya, Mansión, San Antonio districts).

References

Highways in Costa Rica